Ahtisaari is a surname. It may refer to:

Eeva Ahtisaari (born 1936), Finnish teacher and historian, the First Lady of Finland from 1994 to 2000  married to the 10th President of Finland Martti Ahtisaari
Marko Ahtisaari (born 1969), Finnish technology entrepreneur and musician
Martti Ahtisaari (born 1937), Finnish politician, the tenth President of Finland (1994–2000), a Nobel Peace Prize laureate, and a United Nations diplomat and mediator

See also
Ahtisaari Plan, formally the Comprehensive Proposal for the Kosovo Status Settlement (CSP), a status settlement proposed by former President of Finland Martti Ahtisaari covering a wide range of issues related to the status of Kosovo